Joan Haslip (1912–1994) was an author of historical books, often focusing on European royalty. She was born in London and educated in London, Paris, and Florence. Her first book, Out of Focus, appeared in 1931; among her other notable publications are biographies of Lady Hester Stanhope (1934) and Charles Stewart Parnell (1937). In addition, she was a regular journalist for the London Mercury, the Daily Mail, Evening News, and The Illustrated London News.

She also worked for the Italian section of the BBC from 1941 to 1944. Her books were generally regarded as accurate and fairly complete, although at times falling prey to "outdated interpretations".

Haslip was a Fellow of the Royal Society of Literature.

Partial List of her works 
 Out of Focus (1931)
 Preface to Recipes from Vienna: 1933, Evelyn Bach, Cobden-Sanderson
 Lady Hester Stanhope(1934)
 Parnell (1937)
 The Lonely Empress: a Biography of Elizabeth of Austria.
 Lucrezia Borgia (1953)
 The Sultan – The Life of Sultan Abdul Hamid (1968)
 The Crown of Mexico: Maximilian and his Empress Carlota, 1972 Holt, Rinehart and Winston;  
 Imperial Adventurer: Emperor Maximilian of Mexico
 Catherine the Great: 1977 A biography 
 Marie Antoinette 
 The Emperor and the Actress 1982
 Madame du Barry: The Wages of Beauty 1992

References

1912 births
1994 deaths
20th-century British historians
British expatriates in France
British expatriates in Italy